Langford is an unincorporated community in Kent County, Maryland, United States.

References

Unincorporated communities in Kent County, Maryland
Unincorporated communities in Maryland